is a railway station in the city of Kiyosu, Aichi Prefecture,  Japan, operated by Meitetsu.

Lines

Station layout
The station has two opposed side platforms connected by a footbridge. The station has automated ticket machines, Manaca automated turnstiles and is unattended.

Platforms

Adjacent stations

|-
!colspan=5|Nagoya Railroad

Station history
Shimo Otai Station was opened on August 6, 1912.  It has been unattended since 2004.

Passenger statistics
In fiscal 2013, the station was used by an average of 3,366 passengers daily.

Surrounding area
 former Nishibiwa Town Hall
 ruins of Otai Castle
Japan National Route 22

See also
 List of Railway Stations in Japan

References

External links

 Official web page 

Railway stations in Japan opened in 1912
Railway stations in Aichi Prefecture
Stations of Nagoya Railroad
Kiyosu, Aichi